KLGB may refer to:

 KLGB-LP, a defunct low-power radio station (94.3 FM) formerly licensed to Enid, Oklahoma, United States
 the ICAO code for Long Beach Airport, in Long Beach, California, United States